Alpha Delta Gamma, commonly known as ADG, is an American Greek-letter Catholic social fraternity and one of 75 members of the North American Interfraternity Conference (NIC). Based on Christian principles and the traditions of the Jesuit Order of the Catholic Church, Alpha Delta Gamma was founded at Loyola University Chicago on October 10, 1924, as a response to the unwillingness of most national fraternities to colonize at Catholic colleges and universities.

Since its founding, Alpha Delta Gamma has expanded conservatively to keep a small but strong brotherhood; thus, the fraternity has chartered 33 chapters in its long history.  Today, Alpha Delta Gamma operates 12 active chapters at private and public colleges across the United States, stretching from Los Angeles, California, to New York City, New York.

History
Alpha Delta Gamma was founded at the Lake Shore campus of Loyola University Chicago on October 10, 1924, by four students: Francis Patrick Canary, John Joseph Dwyer, William S. Hallisey, and James Collins O'Brien Jr. According to the Alpha Delta Gamma National Web Site, "In effect, they wanted a fraternity founded upon Christian ideals of true manhood, sound learning, and the unity of fraternal brotherhood. These ideals decreed the purpose of Alpha Delta Gamma when it first came into being. And so the foundation was set, Alpha Delta Gamma was on its way to becoming a city walled!"

In 1926, members of the local organization Delta Theta at Saint Louis University in St. Louis, Missouri, contacted the Alpha chapter at Loyola University Chicago, requesting permission to affiliate with the then-existing fraternity.  Their request was granted and, on October 26, 1927, Alpha Delta Gamma officially charted its Beta chapter, becoming a national fraternity.  The fraternity continued expanding to other Catholic colleges and universities and adopted the descriptive "National Catholic-College Fraternity."  This was eventually changed to "National Catholic Social Fraternity" when the organization began expansion to non-Catholic colleges and universities.

Alpha Delta Gamma has remained a small national fraternity, granting charters to 32 collegiate chapters, twelve of which are active. Most chapters are located at Catholic universities, but there are no religious requirements for membership.

Symbols and traditions 
The Fraternity's badge is hexagonal, in gold, which is optionally plain, beveled, or jeweled with pearls and ruby points. Members are instructed to wear the pin at a 45° angle with the appropriate chapter guard.

The pledge button is a diamond-shaped slab of gold with a bright red enamel center. The fraternity's colors are scarlet red and gold. The fraternity's flower is the red carnation. A universal ADG Night is celebrated on the first Friday of December each year, commemorating the founding of the fraternity. Active chapters annually support at least one function for the benefit of orphans such as a Christmas toy drive or spring picnic.

Chapters
These are twelve active chapters of Alpha Delta Gamma fraternity, listed in bold.  Inactive chapters are listed in italic.

Notes

Notable members
These names and additional famous Alpha Delts are listed on the Alpha Delta Gamma National Fraternity website.

 Pascal F. Calogero Jr. – chief justice of the Louisiana Supreme Court (Epsilon chapter)
 Joseph Paul Clayton – former president and CEO of DISH Network Corporation, former CEO of Sirius Satellite Radio, president and CEO of Frontier Communications  (Xi chapter)
 Edward Derwinski – former United States Congressman from Illinois; first United States Secretary of Veterans Affairs (Alpha chapter)
 John (Jack) Grundhoffer – former CEO and chairman of US Bank (Lambda chapter)
 Nathan H. Lents – scientist, author, science communicator (Beta chapter)
 Walter J. Ong – Jesuit, cultural and religious philosopher, historian (Zeta chapter)
 Michael R. Quinlan – former chairman and CEO of McDonald's Corp. (Alpha chapter)
 Richard G. Thomas – chief test pilot Tacit Blue/ Area 51 Northrop Corporation (Beta chapter)
 Patrick Wayne – actor (Lambda chapter)
 Hunter Wendelstedt – Major League Baseball umpire (Epsilon chapter)
 Harry Wiggins – former State Senator of Missouri (Zeta chapter)
 Phil Woolpert – head basketball coach, University of San Francisco Dons (Lambda chapter)
 J. Skelly Wright – judge, United States Court of Appeals for the District of Columbia Circuit (Epsilon chapter)

Notable honorary members
 George Brett – Hall of Fame baseball player
 de Lesseps Story Morrison – mayor of New Orleans and ambassador to the Organization of American States
 Babe Ruth – Hall of Fame baseball player
 Carl Sandburg – poet
 Victor H. Schiro – mayor of New Orleans
 Harry S. Truman –President of the United States of America

References

North American Interfraternity Conference
Student organizations established in 1924
Christian organizations established in 1924
Loyola University Chicago
Catholic University of America
Christian fraternities and sororities in the United States
1924 establishments in Illinois